The 2011 Kentucky gubernatorial election was held on November 8, 2011, to elect the governor of Kentucky and the lieutenant governor of Kentucky. Incumbent Democrat Steve Beshear won re-election, defeating Republican challenger David L. Williams, then the president of the state senate, and Gatewood Galbraith, an independent candidate. Statewide turnout in this election was 28%.

Background
On July 19, 2009, Beshear announced his intention to run for re-election. However, in that announcement, he stated that then-Louisville mayor Jerry Abramson would be his running mate in 2011 instead of current Lt. Governor Daniel Mongiardo, who chose to run for the U.S. Senate in 2010. Kentucky state law requires that gubernatorial candidates file to run with running mates, otherwise they cannot legally raise money. Beshear wanted to fundraise and this would have required Mongiardo also saying that he was running in 2011, which he couldn't do. Beshear and Abramson did not face any opposition for the Democratic nomination.

Among Republicans, Kentucky State Senate President David Williams from Burkesville announced his official candidacy along with running mate Richie Farmer, the term-limited State Agriculture Commissioner and former Kentucky Wildcats basketball player.  Louisville businessman Phil Moffett also announced his ticket with State Representative Mike Harmon from Danville as his running mate.  Moffett was seen as the Tea Party favorite.  However, Williams also advocated for similar positions as Moffett, such as the repeal of the Seventeenth Amendment to the United States Constitution and promoting tax reforms similar to what Moffett proposed.

Attorney Gatewood Galbraith of Lexington filed to run his fourth gubernatorial campaign as an independent on July 4, 2009, choosing marketing consultant Dea Riley as his running mate.

Democratic primary

Candidates

Declared
Steve Beshear, incumbent governor of Kentucky, 2007-2016; former Lt. Governor of Kentucky, 1983-1987; former Attorney General of Kentucky, 1979-1983; and former State Representative, 1974-1979.
Running mate: Jerry Abramson, Louisville Mayor, 1986-1999 and 2003-2011.

Results

Republican primary

Candidates

Declared
Bobbie Holsclaw, Jefferson County Clerk, 1998-2010, 2014–present
Running mate: Bill Vermillion, retired U.S. Navy master chief
Phil Moffett, Louisville businessman and Tea Party activist
Running mate: Mike Harmon, state representative, 2003-2016
David L. Williams, state senate president, 2000-2012; state senator 1987-2012; and nominee for U.S. Senate in 1992
Running mate: Richie Farmer, Kentucky Agriculture Commissioner, 2004-2012

Polling

Results

Independents

Declared
Gatewood Galbraith, attorney, industrial hemp advocate and perennial candidate
Running mate: Dea Riley, political consultant

General election

Predictions

Polling

With Moffett

With Holsclaw

Results

See also
2011 United States elections
2011 United States gubernatorial elections

References

External links
Candidates
Steve Beshear for Governor
David Williams for Governor
Gatewood Galbraith for Governor
Information
Kentucky State Board of Elections
Kentucky gubernatorial election, 2011 at Ballotpedia
Kentucky Governor Candidates at Project Vote Smart
Campaign contributions for 2011 Kentucky Governor from Follow the Money
Kentucky Governor 2011 from OurCampaigns.com
2011 Kentucky Governor – Williams vs. Beshear vs. Galbraith from Real Clear Politics

Gubernatorial
2011
2011 United States gubernatorial elections
November 2011 events in the United States